Ajax (1901 – 15 February 1915) was an undefeated French Thoroughbred racehorse who won the 1904 Prix du Jockey Club and Grand Prix de Paris and was an influential sire.

Breeding
Bred and raced by Edmond Blanc, he was by Flying Fox and out of Amie, whose sire Clamart also won the Grand Prix de Paris. Ajax is a brother to Adam, a sire who was exported to the United States in 1906 and then in 1908 to Austria.

Racing record
Ajax was trained by Robert Denman and ridden by jockey, George Stern. In 1904 the three-year-old colt won the two most prestigious races in France, the Prix du Jockey Club and the Grand Prix de Paris before retiring undefeated after five starts.

At stud, Ajax was an influential stallion who sired Union (his first classic winner and the 3rd dam of Le Pacha) and Teddy. His daughters produced the undefeated Havresac II, Invershin, Massine and Le Correge. Ajax died on 15 February 1915.

Pedigree

Note: b. = Bay, br. = Brown, ch. = Chestnut

* Ajax was inbred 3x4 to Galopin. This means that the stallion appears once in the third generation and once in the fourth generation of his pedigree.

See also
List of leading Thoroughbred racehorses

References

External links
 Ajax at Thoroughbred Heritage

1901 racehorse births
1915 racehorse deaths
Racehorses bred in France
Racehorses trained in France
French Thoroughbred Classic Race winners
Undefeated racehorses
Thoroughbred family 2-i